The 2021 NBA draft, the 75th edition of the National Basketball Association's annual draft, was held on July 29, 2021, at Barclays Center in Brooklyn, New York. With the first overall pick, the Detroit Pistons selected Cade Cunningham. The NBA used a "ceremonial pick" for the late Terrence Clarke, between the 14th and 15th pick of the draft.

Draft picks

Notable undrafted players

These players were not selected in the 2021 NBA draft, but have played at least one game in the NBA.

Trades involving draft picks

Pre-draft trades
Prior to the draft, the following trades were made and resulted in exchanges of draft picks between teams.

Draft-night trades
Draft-night trades were made after the draft began. These trades are usually not confirmed until the next day or after free agency officially begins.

Combine
Prior to the NBA Draft Combine, the 2021 NBA G League Elite Camp, which took place on June 19–21 at the Wintrust Arena and Marriott Marquis in Chicago, provided another chance for players not originally invited to the combine to impress scouts. The best performers from this camp were given invites to the main combine.

The NBA Draft Combine was held on June 21–27 at the same site sponsored by Microsoft. A total of 69 players attended the NBA Draft Combine 2021, with these players undergoing a series of interviews, five-on-five games, drills, and measurements. The combine also featured some recent graduates of the inaugural NBA G League Ignite team, which is a developmental basketball program meant to provide prospects with a paid alternative to playing NCAA college basketball. The success of these players, Jalen Green, Jonathan Kuminga, Daishen Nix, and Isaiah Todd, may pave the way for more top prospects to participate in the G League system pre-draft.

Projected top picks who decided not to attend the NBA Draft Combine include potential No. 1 pick Cade Cunningham and likely top-four pick Jalen Suggs. Numerous other potential prospects, especially those playing overseas, also decided to skip the Combine.

Draft lottery
The NBA draft lottery was held on June 22. It was also televised nationally on ESPN.

Eligibility and entrants

The draft is conducted under the eligibility rules established in the league's 2017 collective bargaining agreement (CBA) with its players' union, with special modifications agreed to by both parties due to disruptions caused by the COVID-19 pandemic. The previous CBA that ended the 2011 lockout instituted no immediate changes to the draft. but called for a committee of owners and players to discuss further charges.

All drafted players must be at least 19 years old during the calendar year of the draft. In term of dates, players who were eligible for the 2021 NBA draft must have been born on or before December 31, 2002.
This draft could have possibly been the last in which high school players of any nationality are ineligible for pick after graduation as the two associations sought at first to lower the minimum age back to 18 and end the need to wait one year after their high school class graduated, also called the "one and done" requirement, ahead of next year's edition, as discussed in 2019. If approved, the current CBA may have to be amended and the amendment ratified. However, the ineligibility for the draft shortly after high school remained in place, as reported in 2020, unless there were further discussions about its repeal. 
Since the 2016 draft, the following rules are, as implemented by the NCAA Division I council for that division:
Declaration for the draft no longer results in automatic loss of college eligibility. As long as a player does not sign a contract with a professional team outside the NBA, or sign with an agent, he retains college eligibility as long as he makes a timely withdrawal from the draft. 
NCAA players now have 10 days after the end of the NBA Draft Combine to withdraw from the draft. Since the combine is normally held in mid-May, the current deadline is about five weeks after the previous mid-April deadline.
NCAA players may participate in the draft combine, and are allowed to attend one tryout per year with each NBA team without losing college eligibility.
NCAA players may now enter and withdraw from the draft up to two times without loss of eligibility. Previously, the NCAA treated a second declaration of draft eligibility as a permanent loss of college eligibility.

The NBA announced on February 26, 2021, that for this draft only, all college players who wished to enter the draft, regardless of class, had to formally declare eligibility. In October 2020, COVID-19 led the NCAA to declare that the 2020–21 season would not be counted against the college eligibility of any basketball player. The exact language of the CBA with regard to automatic eligibility of college seniors is "The player has graduated from a four-year college or university in the United States, and has no remaining intercollegiate basketball eligibility." Due to the NCAA ruling, every college senior in the 2020–21 season had remaining eligibility. The league was required to consult with the players' union and the NCAA to determine whether it would require seniors to opt out of the draft (which was implemented by the NFL for its 2021 draft, affected by a similar NCAA ruling for football) or require opt-ins, with the latter option being chosen.

Early entrants
Players who were not automatically eligible had to declare their eligibility for the draft by notifying the NBA offices in writing no later than at least 60 days before the event. For the 2021 draft, the date fell on May 30. Under the CBA a player may withdraw his name from consideration from the draft at any time before the final declaration deadline, which usually falls 10 days before the draft at 5:00 pm EDT (2100 UTC). Under current NCAA rules, players usually have until 10 days after the draft combine to withdraw from the draft and retain college eligibility. In 2021, however, they must have withdrawn on or before July 7, 22 days prior to this draft.

A player who has hired an agent retains his remaining college eligibility regardless of whether he is drafted after an evaluation from the NBA Undergraduate Advisory Committee. Players who declare for the NBA draft and are not selected have the opportunity to return to their school for at least another year only after terminating all agreements with their agents, who must have been certified no later than August 1, 2020.

The NBA released its official list of early entrants on June 2, 2021, consisting of 296 players from college and other educational institutions and 57 international players. The current version of the list found in this article omits players who withdrew from the draft after June 2.

College underclassmen
Terrence Clarke, a freshman guard from Kentucky, declared for the draft, but died on April 22, three months before the draft. At the draft, the NBA honored him with an honorary selection.

 Santi Aldama – F, Loyola (MD) (sophomore)
 Joël Ayayi – G, Gonzaga (redshirt junior)
 Dalano Banton – G, Nebraska (redshirt sophomore)
 Scottie Barnes – F, Florida State (freshman)
 Charles Bassey – C, Western Kentucky (junior)
 Giorgi Bezhanishvili – F, Illinois (junior)
 Brandon Boston Jr. – G,  Kentucky (freshman)
 James Bouknight – G, UConn (sophomore)
 Pedro Bradshaw – F, Bellarmine (redshirt junior)
 Greg Brown – F, Texas (freshman)
 Jared Butler – G, Baylor (junior)
 D. J. Carton – G, Marquette (sophomore)
 Justin Champagnie – F, Pittsburgh (sophomore)
 Josh Christopher – G, Arizona State (freshman)
 Sharife Cooper – G, Auburn (freshman)
 Derek Culver – C, West Virginia (junior)
 Sam Cunliffe – G, Evansville (redshirt junior)
 Cade Cunningham – G, Oklahoma State (freshman)
 Ayo Dosunmu – G, Illinois (junior)
 David Duke Jr. – G, Providence (junior)
 Nojel Eastern – G, Purdue (junior)
 Kessler Edwards – F, Pepperdine (junior)
 RaiQuan Gray – F, Florida State (redshirt junior)
 Alan Griffin – G, Syracuse (junior)
 Quentin Grimes – G, Houston (junior)
 Aaron Henry – F, Michigan State (junior)
 Feron Hunt – F, SMU (junior)
 Matthew Hurt – F, Duke (sophomore)
 Bones Hyland – G, VCU (sophomore)
 Isaiah Jackson – F, Kentucky (freshman)
 David Johnson – G, Louisville (sophomore)
 Jalen Johnson – F, Duke (freshman)
 Keon Johnson – G, Tennessee (freshman)
 Kai Jones – F, Texas (sophomore)
 Balša Koprivica – C, Florida State (sophomore)
 A. J. Lawson – G, South Carolina (junior)
 Scottie Lewis – G, Florida (sophomore)
 Tre Mann – G, Florida (sophomore)
 Miles McBride – G, West Virginia (sophomore)
 Mac McClung – G, Texas Tech (junior)
 Davion Mitchell – G, Baylor (redshirt junior)
 Evan Mobley – F/C, USC (freshman)
 Moses Moody – G, Arkansas (freshman)
 Trey Murphy III – F, Virginia (junior)
 RJ Nembhard – G, TCU (redshirt junior)
 Joel Ntambwe – F, Texas Tech (redshirt sophomore)
 Jason Preston – G, Ohio (junior)
 Joshua Primo – G, Alabama (freshman)
 Neemias Queta – C, Utah State (junior)
 Jeremiah Robinson-Earl – F, Villanova (sophomore)
 Damion Rosser – G, New Orleans (redshirt junior)
 Day'Ron Sharpe – C, North Carolina (freshman)
 Javonte Smart – G, LSU (junior)
 Jaden Springer – G, Tennessee (freshman)
 D. J. Steward – G, Duke (freshman)
 D. J. Stewart Jr. – G, Mississippi State (redshirt sophomore)
 Jalen Suggs – G, Gonzaga (freshman)
 Cam Thomas – G, LSU (freshman)
 JT Thor – F, Auburn (freshman)
 Franz Wagner – F, Michigan (sophomore)
 Kyree Walker – G, Hillcrest Prep Academy (postgraduate)
 Duane Washington Jr. – G, Ohio State (junior)
 Trendon Watford – F, LSU (sophomore)
 Romeo Weems – F, DePaul (sophomore)
 Joe Wieskamp – G, Iowa (junior)
 Aaron Wiggins – G, Maryland (junior)
 Brandon Williams – G, Arizona (sophomore)
 Ziaire Williams – F, Stanford (freshman)
 Bryce Wills – G, Stanford (junior)
 Marcus Zegarowski – G, Creighton (junior)

College seniors
"Redshirt" refers to players who were redshirt seniors in the 2020–21 season. "Graduate" refers to players who were graduate transfers in 2020–21.

 Derrick Alston Jr. – F, Boise State (redshirt)
 Jose Alvarado – G, Georgia Tech
 Jonah Antonio – G, Wake Forest
 Jonathan Baehre – F, Clemson
 Mitch Ballock – G, Creighton
 Troy Baxter Jr. – F, Morgan State
 Chudier Bile – F, Georgetown
 Jahvon Blair – G, Georgetown
 Isaac Bonton – G, Washington State
 Chaundee Brown – G, Michigan 
 Marcus Burk – G, IUPUI (redshirt)
 Jordan Burns – G, Colgate
 Manny Camper – G/F, Siena
 Nahziah Carter – G/F, Washington
 Arinze Chidom – F, UC Riverside
 Matt Coleman III – G, Texas 
 Trevion Crews – G, Bethel (IN)
 T. J. Crockett – G, Lindenwood
 Jalen Crutcher – G, Dayton
 Ryan Daly – G, Saint Joseph's (redshirt)
 Zaccheus Darko-Kelly – G/F, Providence (MT) (redshirt)
 Oscar da Silva – F, Stanford
 Cartier Diarra – G, Virginia Tech
 Marek Dolezaj – F, Syracuse 
 Chris Duarte – G, Oregon 
 Ian DuBose – G, Wake Forest
 Juwan Durham – C, Notre Dame
 Tahj Eaddy – G, USC
 Lydell Elmore – F, High Point
 Romeao Ferguson – G, Lipscomb
 L. J. Figueroa – G, Oregon
 Aleem Ford – F, Wisconsin
 Blake Francis – G, Richmond
 D. J. Funderburk – F/C, NC State
 Ty Gadsden – G, UNC Wilmington
 Gorjok Gak – C, California Baptist
 Marcus Garrett – G, Kansas
 Luka Garza – C, Iowa
 Samson George – F, Central Arkansas
 Asante Gist – G, Iona
 Terrell Gomez – G, San Diego State
 Jordan Goodwin – G, Saint Louis
 Justin Gorham – F, Houston (redshirt)
 Elyjah Goss – F, IUPUI
 Jayvon Graves – G, Buffalo
 Quade Green – G, Washington
 Matt Haarms – C, BYU (graduate)
 Javion Hamlet – G, North Texas (redshirt)
 Deion Hammond – G, Monmouth
 Amauri Hardy – G, Oregon
 Romio Harvey – G, Harding
 Sam Hauser – F, Virginia (redshirt)
 Kashaun Hicks – G, Norfolk State
 Taveion Hollingsworth – G, Western Kentucky
 Jay Huff – F/C, Virginia (redshirt)
 Anthony Hughes Jr. – G, Millsaps
 Jhivvan Jackson – G, UTSA
 Loren Cristian Jackson – G, Akron (redshirt)
 Casdon Jardine – G/F, Hawaii
 DeJon Jarreau – G, Houston
 Tristan Jarrett – G, Jackson State
 Justin Jaworski – G, Lafayette
 Damien Jefferson – F, Creighton (redshirt)
 Bryson Johnson – G, Ozarks
 Carlik Jones – G, Louisville (graduate)
 Herbert Jones – F, Alabama
 Corey Kispert – F, Gonzaga
 Cameron Krutwig – C, Loyola Chicago
 Matt Lewis – G, James Madison
 Spencer Littleson – G, Toledo
 Isaiah Livers – G/F, Michigan
 Denzel Mahoney – G, Creighton (redshirt)
 Makuach Maluach – G, New Mexico
 Sandro Mamukelashvili – F/C, Seton Hall
 Kyle Mangas – G, Indiana Wesleyan
 JaQuori McLaughlin – G, UC Santa Barbara
 Jadyn Michael – G, Colorado Christian
 Isaiah Miller – G, UNC Greensboro
 Asbjørn Midtgaard – C, Grand Canyon
 Damek Mitchell – G, Lewis–Clark State
 Matt Mitchell – F, San Diego State
 Steffon Mitchell – G, Boston College
 Ruot Monyyong – F, Little Rock
 Clay Mounce – G/F, Furman
 Matthew Moyer – F, George Washington
 Obadiah Noel – G, UMass Lowell
 Kobi Nwandu – G, Niagara
 Eugene Omoruyi – F, Oregon (redshirt)
 EJ Onu – F/C, Shawnee State
 Chris Parker – G, Liberty
 Jock Perry – C, UC Riverside (redshirt)
 John Petty Jr. – G, Alabama
 Jamorko Pickett – F, Georgetown
 Danny Pippen – F, Kent State (redshirt)
 Yves Pons – F, Tennessee
 Micah Potter – F, Wisconsin (redshirt)
 Brandon Rachal – F, Tulsa
 Austin Reaves – G, Oklahoma (redshirt)
 Nate Reuvers – C, Wisconsin
 Elvin Rodriguez – G, USAO
 Colbey Ross – G, Pepperdine
 Olivier Sarr – C, Kentucky
 Jordan Schakel – G, San Diego State
 Devontae Shuler – G, Ole Miss
 Aamir Simms – F, Clemson
 Jericho Sims – F, Texas
 Chris Smith – F, UCLA
 Dru Smith – G, Missouri (redshirt)
 Justin Smith – F, Arkansas
 Mike Smith – G, Michigan (graduate)
 Anthony Tarke – G, Coppin State (redshirt)
 Jalen Tate – G, Arkansas
 Terry Taylor – G/F, Austin Peay
 MaCio Teague – G, Baylor (redshirt)
 Christian Terrell – G, Sacramento State (redshirt)
 Koby Thomas – G, Coppin State
 Ethan Thompson – G, Oregon State
 Jeremiah Tilmon – F, Missouri
 D'Mitrik Trice – G, Wisconsin (redshirt)
 Jordy Tshimanga – F, Dayton (redshirt)
 Justin Turner – G, Bowling Green (redshirt)
 Chandler Vaudrin – G, Winthrop (redshirt)
 Eric Vila – F/C, UTEP (redshirt)
 Mark Vital – G/F, Baylor (redshirt)
 M. J. Walker – G, Florida State
 Keaton Wallace – G, UTSA
 Josh Washburn – G, Carthage
 Isaiah Washington – G, Long Beach State
 Romello White – F, Ole Miss (graduate)
 Devin Whitfield – G, Lincoln Memorial (redshirt)
 McKinley Wright IV – G, Colorado
 Moses Wright – F, Georgia Tech

International players
International players that declared for this draft and did not previously declare in another prior draft could drop out 10 days before the event, on July 19. A total of 51 international players withdrew their names from consideration for the draft, with only the following eight prospects remaining after the international deadline.

  Juhann Begarin – G, Paris (France)
  Vrenz Bleijenbergh – F, Antwerp Giants (Belgium)
  Biram Faye – C, Girona (Spain)
  Usman Garuba – F, Real Madrid (Spain)
  Josh Giddey – G, Adelaide 36ers (Australia)
  Rokas Jokubaitis – G, Žalgiris (Lithuania)
  Alperen Şengün – C, Beşiktaş Icrypex (Turkey)
  Amar Sylla – C, Oostende (Belgium)

Automatically eligible entrants
Players who do not meet the criteria for "international" players are automatically eligible if they meet any of the following criteria:
They have no remaining college eligibility.
If they graduated from high school in the U.S., but did not enroll in a U.S. college or university, four years have passed since their high school class graduated.
They have signed a contract with a professional basketball team not in the NBA, anywhere in the world, and have played under the contract.

As noted above, the NCAA's COVID-19 eligibility waiver for 2020–21 resulted in all college seniors having remaining eligibility, leading to the NBA and its players' union agreeing that seniors would have to declare for the 2021 draft.

Players who meet the criteria for "international" players are automatically eligible if they meet any of the following criteria:
They are at least 22 years old during the calendar year of the draft. In term of dates players born on or before December 31, 1999, were automatically eligible for the 2021 draft.
They have signed a contract with a professional basketball team not in the NBA within the United States, and have played under that contract.

See also
 List of first overall NBA draft picks

Notes

References

External links
Official site

Draft
National Basketball Association draft
NBA draft
NBA draft
2020s in Brooklyn
Basketball in New York City
Prospect Heights, Brooklyn
Sports in Brooklyn
Sporting events in New York City
Events in Brooklyn, New York